Myrmarachne melanocephala, is a species of spider of the genus Myrmarachne. It is found throughout the countries ranging from Pakistan to Indonesia. Type locality has been recorded as Bengal of British India (present day West Bengal, India).[1][3]

References

Spiders described in 1839
Salticidae
Spiders of Asia